Jolie Tuzolana Diasilua (born 6 April 1986), known as Jolie Tuzolana, is a DR Congolese footballer who plays as a forward. She has been a member of the DR Congo women's national team.

Club career
Tuzolana has played for La Source Brazzaville in the Republic of the Congo and for Force Terrestre in the Democratic Republic of the Congo.

International career
Tuzolana capped for the DR Congo at senior level during the 2006 African Women's Championship. She also attended the 2012 edition.

See also
 List of Democratic Republic of the Congo women's international footballers

References

1986 births
Living people
Democratic Republic of the Congo women's footballers
Women's association football forwards
Democratic Republic of the Congo women's international footballers
Democratic Republic of the Congo expatriate footballers
Democratic Republic of the Congo expatriate sportspeople in the Republic of the Congo
Expatriate footballers in the Republic of the Congo
21st-century Democratic Republic of the Congo people